The 2003 World Club Challenge match was contested on Sunday, 16 February by National Rugby League season 2002 premiers, the Sydney Roosters and Super League VII premiers, St. Helens. 19,807 spectators turned out at Bolton's Reebok Stadium for the match, which was refereed by Russell Smith.

This was the first time the two clubs had played each other since the inaugural World Club Challenge game at the Sydney Cricket Ground in 1976. On that occasion the Roosters, then known as Eastern Suburbs (as it was a Sydney only competition at the time), defeated St Helens 25-2. The attendance on that occasion was 26,856.

Background

St Helens

Sydney Roosters

Match summary

Teams
The Roosters went into the Challenge making only one change in their starting lineup (Todd Byrne went on to the wing for the retired Brett Mullins). In the end, though, it made no difference as the Sydney Roosters ran out comprehensive 0-38 champions over the Saints outfit. Tries to Craig Fitzgibbon, Adrian Morley, new input Todd Byrne, captain Brad Fittler and Todd Payten plus the 9 goals from Fitzgibbon completed a wonderful season for the Sydney Roosters.

See also
World Club Challenge

External links
2003 World Club Challenge at rugbyleagueproject.com
2003 World Club Challenge at rlphotos.com
2003 World Club Challenge at superleague.co.uk

World Club Challenge
Sydney Roosters matches
St Helens R.F.C. matches
World Club Challenge
World Club Challenge